Babcock Lake may refer to:

Babcock Lake (California)
Babcock Lake (New York)
Babcock Lakes (Washington, D.C.)